The London and North Western Railway (LNWR) Experiment Class was a class of 4-6-0 steam locomotive designed by George Whale.

Career
They were an extended version of the Whale's Precursor Class 4-4-0, with slightly smaller driving wheels.  The first of the class, 66 Experiment was built in 1905 and a total of 105 were constructed up until 1910. The LNWR reused numbers and names of withdrawn locomotives, with the result that the numbering system was completely haphazard. A 19in Express Goods Class with smaller driving wheels was also built from 1906. From 1911, a superheated version, the Prince of Wales Class was built.

In 1915, 1361 Prospero was experimentally rebuilt with four cylinders, Dendy Marshall valve gear and superheated.  The conversion was not repeated. Only two other engines were given superheaters; 2624 Saracen and 1993 (LMS 5472) Richard Moon.

All entered London, Midland and Scottish Railway (LMS) stock upon grouping in 1923. The LMS gave them the power classification 3P.  The LMS renumbered them into a more logical series of 5450–5553 according to date of construction.  An exception was made for 1361 Prospero which became 5554.  Not all however survived long enough to receive their LMS numbers — withdrawals had started in 1925.  In 1934 the thirteen then remaining were renumbered with the addition of 20000 to their numbers make room for Black Five, Patriot and Jubilee class locomotives.  The final engine was withdrawn  the following year and none were preserved.

Fleet list

Accidents and incidents 

Eighteen people were killed.
Four people were killed.

References

External links
 LNWR Society Photographs of the Whale 4-6-0 Experiment class steam locomotives.

Experiment (Whale)
4-6-0 locomotives
Railway locomotives introduced in 1905
Standard gauge steam locomotives of Great Britain
Scrapped locomotives
Passenger locomotives